James Francis Dobbins Jr. (born May 31, 1942) is an American diplomat who served as United States Ambassador to the European Union (1991–1993), as Assistant Secretary of State for European Affairs (2001), and as Special Representative for Afghanistan and Pakistan (May 2013 – July 2014). He is a member of the American Academy of Diplomacy.  He was envoy to Kosovo, Bosnia, Haiti, and Somalia.  In 2001, he led negotiations leading to the Bonn Agreement, and served as acting Ambassador of the United States to Afghanistan during the transitional period. He was head of international and security policy for the RAND Corporation.

Education
Dobbins graduated with a Bachelor of Science in International Affairs from the School of Foreign Service at Georgetown University.

Works
"Iraq: Winning the Unwinnable Wars", Foreign Affairs, January/February 2005
"Who Lost Iraq?", Foreign Affairs, September/October 2007
"Counterinsurgency in Iraq", Senate Armed Services Committee, 2-26-09

 Occupying Iraq: A History of the Coalition Provisional Authority The RAND Corporation. By James Dobbins, Seth G. Jones, Benjamin Runkle, Siddharth Mohandas, 2009.

Bibliography

References

External links
UNJobs.org list of Dobbins authorships
Video discussion with Dobbins and Mark Leon Goldberg on Bloggingheads.tv
"An Interview with James Dobbins", Frontline, Sept. 26, 2003

1942 births
Living people
Ambassadors of the United States to the European Union
People from New York City
Ambassadors of the United States to Afghanistan
United States Special Envoys
United States Foreign Service personnel
20th-century American diplomats
21st-century American diplomats